Michael Brough (born 1 August 1981) is a footballer who plays for Harrogate Town. Although born in England, he has represented Wales at under-21 level.

Career
Brough was born in Nottingham, Nottinghamshire. He began his career as a trainee with Notts County, turning professional in August 1998. In December 1999, he joined Spalding United on loan before returning to Meadow Lane. His League debut came on 7 March 2000 in a 1–0 win away to Gillingham.

He fell out of favour at Notts County and was allowed to join Macclesfield Town on trial in January 2004, after being told that his short-term contract would not be renewed. He also had a trial with Lincoln City the following month.

He was released by Notts County in March 2004 and joined Stevenage Borough, moving on to Forest Green Rovers in January 2006 on a free transfer. He was made captain at Forest Green, under the management of his former Notts County teammate Gary Owers, but left in May 2008 to join Paul Buckle's Torquay United.

He made his Torquay debut in August 2008, playing in the 3–1 defeat away to Crawley Town, after which he lost his place, starting only one other game that season. On 2 February 2009, Brough and fellow Torquay defender Chris Todd joined Salisbury City on loan.

Brough was then loaned to Mansfield Town, and was signed by the club in January 2010, but then went on to join Darlington for the 2010–11 season. He injured a knee in pre-season, and played only seven games for Darlington before undergoing further surgery which was to keep him out of football for nine months. Given a short-term contract in September 2011, he made six appearances for Darlington, but then left the club and spent a month with Conference North club Guiseley, before signing for divisional rivals Harrogate Town in December.

References

External links

Wales stats at 11v11

1981 births
Living people
English footballers
Welsh footballers
Wales under-21 international footballers
Association football midfielders
Notts County F.C. players
Spalding United F.C. players
Stevenage F.C. players
Forest Green Rovers F.C. players
Torquay United F.C. players
Salisbury City F.C. players
Mansfield Town F.C. players
Darlington F.C. players
Guiseley A.F.C. players
Harrogate Town A.F.C. players
English Football League players
National League (English football) players